In enzymology, a galactosyldiacylglycerol alpha-2,3-sialyltransferase is an enzyme that catalyzes the chemical reaction

CMP-N-acetylneuraminate + 1,2-diacyl-3-beta-D-galactosyl-sn-glycerol  CMP + 1,2-diacyl-3-[3-(alpha-D-N-acetylneuraminyl)-beta-D-galactosyl]-sn- glycerol

Thus, the two substrates of this enzyme are CMP-N-acetylneuraminate and 1,2-diacyl-3-beta-D-galactosyl-sn-glycerol, whereas its 3 products are CMP, [[1,2-diacyl-3-[3-(alpha-D-N-acetylneuraminyl)-beta-D-galactosyl]-sn-]], and glycerol.

This enzyme belongs to the family of transferases, specifically those glycosyltransferases that do not transfer hexosyl or pentosyl groups.  The systematic name of this enzyme class is CMP-N-acetylneuraminate:1,2-diacyl-3-beta-D-galactosyl-sn-glycerol N-acetylneuraminyltransferase. This enzyme participates in glycerolipid metabolism.

References

 
 
 

EC 2.4.99
Enzymes of unknown structure